Millennium Palace Camboriú is a residential condominium skyscraper in Balneário Camboriú, Santa Catarina, Brazil. It was the first building in 50 years to surpass Mirante do Vale as the tallest in Brazil, a position it held before being surpassed by Infinity Coast in 2019. Millennium Palace has 45 floors up to, and including, the first floor of the two-floor penthouse, plus the additional second floor of the penthouse, totaling  in height and 46 floors.

Millennium Palace Residence is a luxury development project, and with one of the largest total investment values in Balneário Camboriú and also of Southern Brasil, due to the materials used and technology employed.

The Development project was inaugurated on 10 August 2014.

Above this the Penthouse has one more floor plus the roof and the small version of the mini Eiffel tower.

Above this, the building has a mini tower, small replica version of the Eiffel Tower at the top, on the roof below and going up.

See also
 Yachthouse Residence Club
 Infinity Coast
 List of tallest buildings in Brazil
 List of tallest buildings in South America

References 

 Millennium Palace at Emporis
 Millenium Palace teve forte engajamento dos colaboradores durante a construção

|-

Balneário Camboriú
Buildings and structures in Santa Catarina (state)
Residential skyscrapers in Brazil
Buildings and structures completed in 2014
Residential skyscrapers